Emily Eva Mullenger Sloan (October 27, 1878 – September 16, 1973) became the first woman elected to the office of county attorney in Montana in 1924. She  won her election as County Attorney in Carbon County, Montana by 33 votes. She was the 22nd female attorney in Montana.

Sloan was born in Oregon, Wisconsin and grew up in South Dakota; she lived in Belle Fourche, South Dakota as a teenager. She became a ranch wife and raised four children. Because she did not have a high school diploma, she was accepted as a special student at the University of Montana Law School, where she studied from October 1, 1917 to June 2, 1919.

Although she was not able to complete her studies and graduate, she passed the bar exam and was admitted to the Montana Bar in June 1919. She practiced law in Yellowstone County, Montana for three years. Then she moved to Red Lodge, Montana to run for County Attorney.

She worked as the Carbon County attorney from 1924 to 1926. In 1938 she sought, but failed to secure, nomination for clerk of the district court.

She is also known for a 1956 novel set in Rhame, North Dakota, Prairie Schoolma'am, and a book of poetry, Ballads of the Plains.

She lived into her 90s.

Works 

Hitting the High Spots. Mesa, Arizona: V. Carter Service, 1959. OCLC: 41768210

References

External links

1878 births
1973 deaths
People from Belle Fourche, South Dakota
People from Red Lodge, Montana
People from Oregon, Wisconsin
University of Montana alumni
Ranchers from South Dakota
Montana lawyers
Writers from Montana
Writers from South Dakota
Novelists from Wisconsin
American women novelists
American women poets
20th-century American novelists
20th-century American poets
20th-century American lawyers
County district attorneys in Montana
20th-century American women writers